The Bassin de Naurouze is an octagonal holding tank, created during the building of the Canal du Midi as designed and built by Pierre-Paul Riquet.  It was abandoned a few years after construction of the canal because of its recurrent silting problems.  The flow of water from the Bassin de Saint-Ferréol joins the Canal du Midi at this point near the Seuil de Naurouze.  Riquet hoped to build a city around the basin and also considered building a port. However, it easily filled with silt and its use discontinued. A lawn replaced the empty pool, and it is crossed by a straight path lined with plane trees.

Gallery

References

Canal_du_Midi